Renardia is a genus of unmargined rove beetles in the family Staphylinidae. There are at least two described species in Renardia.

Species 
These two species belong to the genus Renardia:

 Renardia canadensis (Horn, 1871) i c g
 Renardia nigrella (LeConte, 1863) i c g b
Data sources: i = ITIS, c = Catalogue of Life, g = GBIF, b = Bugguide.net

References

Further reading

External links

 

Osoriinae
Articles created by Qbugbot